An astrolabe is an ancient astronomical instrument that was a handheld model of the universe. Its various functions also make it an elaborate inclinometer and an analog calculation device capable of working out several kinds of problems in astronomy. In its simplest form it is a metal disc with a pattern of wires, cutouts, and perforations that allows a user to calculate astronomical positions precisely. Historically used by astronomers, it is able to measure the altitude above the horizon of a celestial body, day or night; it can be used to identify stars or planets, to determine local latitude given local time (and vice versa), to survey, or to triangulate. It was used in classical antiquity, the Islamic Golden Age, the European Middle Ages and the Age of Discovery for all these purposes.

The astrolabe's importance comes not only from the early developments into the study of astronomy, but is also effective for determining latitude on land or calm seas. Although it is less reliable on the heaving deck of a ship in rough seas, the mariner's astrolabe was developed to solve that problem.

Applications 

A 10th-century astronomer deduced that there were around 1000 applications for the astrolabe's various functions, and these ranged from the astrological, the astronomical and the religious, to seasonal and daily time-keeping and tide tables. At the time of their use, astrology was widely considered as much of a serious science as astronomy, and study of the two went hand-in-hand. The astronomical interest varied between folk astronomy (of the pre-Islamic tradition in Arabia) which was concerned with celestial and seasonal observations, and mathematical astronomy, which would inform intellectual practices and precise calculations based on astronomical observations. In regards to the astrolabe's religious functionality, the demands of Islamic prayer times were to be astronomically determined to ensure precise daily timings, and the qibla, the direction of Mecca towards which Muslims must pray, could also be determined by this device. In addition to this, the lunar calendar that was informed by the calculations of the astrolabe was of great significance to the religion of Islam, given that it determines the dates of important religious observances such as Ramadan.

Etymology
The Oxford English Dictionary gives the translation "star-taker" for the English word astrolabe and traces it through medieval Latin to the Greek word ἀστρολάβος : , from ἄστρον :   "star" and λαμβάνειν :  "to take".

In the medieval Islamic world the Arabic word  (i.e., astrolabe) was given various etymologies. 
"star-taker"), a direct translation of the Greek word.

Al-Biruni quotes and criticises medieval scientist Hamza al-Isfahani who stated: "asturlab is an arabisation of this Persian phrase" (meaning "taker of the stars"). In medieval Islamic sources, there is also a folk etymology of the word as "lines of lab", where "Lab" refers to a certain son of Idris (Enoch). This etymology is mentioned by a 10th-century scientist named al-Qummi but rejected by al-Khwarizmi.

History

Ancient world
An early astrolabe was invented in the Hellenistic civilization by Apollonius of Perga between 220 and 150 BC, often attributed to Hipparchus. The astrolabe was a marriage of the planisphere and dioptra, effectively an analog calculator capable of working out several different kinds of problems in astronomy. Theon of Alexandria ( – ) wrote a detailed treatise on the astrolabe, and Lewis argues that Ptolemy used an astrolabe to make the astronomical observations recorded in the Tetrabiblos. The invention of the plane astrolabe is sometimes wrongly attributed to Theon's daughter Hypatia (died 415 AD), but it is, in fact, known to have already been in use at least 500 years before Hypatia was born. The misattribution comes from a misinterpretation of a statement in a letter written by Hypatia's pupil Synesius ( – ), which mentions that Hypatia had taught him how to construct a plane astrolabe, but does not state anything about her having invented it herself.

Astrolabes continued in use in the Greek-speaking world throughout the Byzantine period. About 550 AD, Christian philosopher John Philoponus wrote a treatise on the astrolabe in Greek, which is the earliest extant treatise on the instrument. Mesopotamian bishop Severus Sebokht also wrote a treatise on the astrolabe in the Syriac language in the mid-7th century. Sebokht refers to the astrolabe as being made of brass in the introduction of his treatise, indicating that metal astrolabes were known in the Christian East well before they were developed in the Islamic world or in the Latin West.

The first Renaissance treatises dealing with scientific problems were based on earlier classical works and were often concerned with Ptolemaic doctrines.

Medieval era
Astrolabes were further developed in the medieval Islamic world, where Muslim astronomers introduced angular scales to the design, adding circles indicating azimuths on the horizon. It was widely used throughout the Muslim world, chiefly as an aid to navigation and as a way of finding the Qibla, the direction of Mecca. Eighth-century mathematician Muhammad al-Fazari is the first person credited with building the astrolabe in the Islamic world.

The mathematical background was established by Muslim astronomer Albatenius in his treatise Kitab az-Zij (c. 920 AD), which was translated into Latin by Plato Tiburtinus (De Motu Stellarum). The earliest surviving astrolabe is dated AH 315 (927–28 AD). In the Islamic world, astrolabes were used to find the times of sunrise and the rising of fixed stars, to help schedule morning prayers (salat). In the 10th century, al-Sufi first described over 1,000 different uses of an astrolabe, in areas as diverse as astronomy, astrology, navigation, surveying, timekeeping, prayer, Salat, Qibla, etc.

The spherical astrolabe was a variation of both the astrolabe and the armillary sphere, invented during the Middle Ages by astronomers and inventors in the Islamic world.
The earliest description of the spherical astrolabe dates back to Al-Nayrizi (fl. 892–902). In the 12th century, Sharaf al-Dīn al-Tūsī invented the linear astrolabe, sometimes called the "staff of al-Tusi", which was "a simple wooden rod with graduated markings but without sights. It was furnished with a plumb line and a double chord for making angular measurements and bore a perforated pointer". The geared mechanical astrolabe was invented by Abi Bakr of Isfahan in 1235.

The first known metal astrolabe in Western Europe is the Destombes astrolabe made from brass in the eleventh century in Portugal. Metal astrolabes avoided the warping that large wooden ones were prone to, allowing the construction of larger and therefore more accurate instruments. Metal astrolabes were heavier than wooden instruments of the same size, making it difficult to use them in navigation.

Herman Contractus of Reichenau Abbey, examined the use of the astrolabe in Mensura Astrolai during the 11th century. Peter of Maricourt wrote a treatise on the construction and use of a universal astrolabe in the last half of the 13th century entitled Nova compositio astrolabii particularis. Universal astrolabes can be found at the History of Science Museum in Oxford. David A. King, historian of Islamic instrumentation, describes the universal astrolobe designed by Ibn al-Sarraj of Aleppo (aka Ahmad bin Abi Bakr; fl. 1328) as "the most sophisticated astronomical instrument from the entire Medieval and Renaissance periods".

English author Geoffrey Chaucer (c. 1343–1400) compiled A Treatise on the Astrolabe for his son, mainly based on a work by Messahalla or Ibn al-Saffar. The same source was translated by French astronomer and astrologer Pélerin de Prusse and others. The first printed book on the astrolabe was Composition and Use of Astrolabe by Christian of Prachatice, also using Messahalla, but relatively original.

In 1370, the first Indian treatise on the astrolabe was written by the Jain astronomer Mahendra Suri, titled Yantrarāja.

A simplified astrolabe, known as a balesilha, was used by sailors to get an accurate reading of latitude while out to sea. The use of the balesilha was promoted by Prince Henry (1394–1460) while out navigating for Portugal.

The astrolabe was almost certainly first brought north of the Pyrenees by Gerbert of Aurillac (future Pope Sylvester II), where it was integrated into the quadrivium at the school in Reims, France, sometime before the turn of the 11th century. In the 15th century, French instrument maker Jean Fusoris (c. 1365–1436) also started remaking and selling astrolabes in his shop in Paris, along with portable sundials and other popular scientific devices of the day. Thirteen of his astrolabes survive to this day.  One more special example of craftsmanship in early 15th-century Europe is the astrolabe designed by Antonius de Pacento and made by Dominicus de Lanzano, dated 1420.
In the 16th century, Johannes Stöffler published Elucidatio fabricae ususque astrolabii, a manual of the construction and use of the astrolabe. Four identical 16th-century astrolabes made by Georg Hartmann provide some of the earliest evidence for batch production by division of labor.  In 1612, Greek painter Ieremias Palladas incorporated a sophisticated astrolabe in his painting depicting Catherine of Alexandria.  The painting was entitled Catherine of Alexandria and featured a device called the System of the Universe (Σύστημα τοῦ Παντός).   The device featured the planets with the names in Greek: Selene (moon), Hermes (Mercury), Aphrodite (Venus), Helios (Sun), Ares (Mars), Zeus (Jupiter), and Chronos (Saturn).  The device also featured celestial spheres following the Ptolemaic model and Earth was depicted as a blue sphere with circles of geographic coordinates. A complex line representing the axis of the Earth covered the entire instrument.

Astrolabes and clocks

Mechanical astronomical clocks were initially influenced by the astrolabe; they could be seen in many ways as clockwork astrolabes designed to produce a continual display of the current position of the sun, stars, and planets. For example, Richard of Wallingford's clock (c. 1330) consisted essentially of a star map rotating behind a fixed rete, similar to that of an astrolabe.

Many astronomical clocks use an astrolabe-style display, such as the famous clock at Prague, adopting a stereographic projection (see below) of the ecliptic plane. In recent times, astrolabe watches have become popular. For example, Swiss watchmaker Dr. Ludwig Oechslin designed and built an astrolabe wristwatch in conjunction with Ulysse Nardin in 1985. Dutch watchmaker Christaan van der Klauuw also manufactures astrolabe watches today.

Construction
An astrolabe consists of a disk, called the mater (mother), which is deep enough to hold one or more flat plates called tympans, or climates. A tympan is made for a specific latitude and is engraved with a stereographic projection of circles denoting azimuth and altitude and representing the portion of the celestial sphere above the local horizon. The rim of the mater is typically graduated into hours of time, degrees of arc, or both.

Above the mater and tympan, the rete, a framework bearing a projection of the ecliptic plane and several pointers indicating the positions of the brightest stars, is free to rotate. These pointers are often just simple points, but depending on the skill of the craftsman can be very elaborate and artistic. There are examples of astrolabes with artistic pointers in the shape of balls, stars, snakes, hands, dogs' heads, and leaves, among others. The names of the indicated stars were often engraved on the pointers in Arabic or Latin. Some astrolabes have a narrow rule or label which rotates over the rete, and may be marked with a scale of declinations.

The rete, representing the sky, functions as a star chart. When it is rotated, the stars and the ecliptic move over the projection of the coordinates on the tympan. One complete rotation corresponds to the passage of a day. The astrolabe is, therefore, a predecessor of the modern planisphere.

On the back of the mater, there is often engraved a number of scales that are useful in the astrolabe's various applications. These vary from designer to designer, but might include curves for time conversions, a calendar for converting the day of the month to the sun's position on the ecliptic, trigonometric scales, and graduation of 360 degrees around the back edge. The alidade is attached to the back face. An alidade can be seen in the lower right illustration of the Persian astrolabe above. When the astrolabe is held vertically, the alidade can be rotated and the sun or a star sighted along its length, so that its altitude in degrees can be read ("taken") from the graduated edge of the astrolabe; hence the word's Greek roots: "astron" (ἄστρον) = star + "lab-" (λαβ-) = to take.

A shadow square also appears on the back of some astrolabes, developed by Muslim astrologists in the 9th Century, whereas devices of the Ancient Greek tradition featured only altitude scales on the back of the devices. This was used to convert shadow lengths and the altitude of the sun, the uses of which were various from surveying to measuring inaccessible heights.

Devices were usually signed by their maker with an inscription appearing on the back of the astrolabe, and if there was a patron of the object, their name would appear inscribed on the front, or in some cases, the name of the reigning sultan or the teacher of the astrolabist has also been found to appear inscribed in this place. The date of the astrolabe's construction was often also signed, which has allowed historians to determine that these devices are the second oldest scientific instrument in the world. The inscriptions on astrolabes also allowed historians to conclude that astronomers tended to make their own astrolabes, but that many were also made to order and kept in stock to sell, suggesting there was some contemporary market for the devices.

Parts of the astrolabe consisted of a circular disk, a sighting tube, an alidade, and arms that held graduated scales. The circular disk is the main part of the astrolabe. It was mainly used to view figures in the sky. The sighting tube is placed on top of the circular disk and was used to observe stars or planets. The alidade had vertical and horizontal cross-hairs which plots locations on an azimuthal ring called an almucantar (altitude-distance circle). An arm called a radius connects from the center of the astrolabe to the optical axis which is parallel with another arm also called a radius. The other radius contains graduations of altitude and distance measurements.

See also
 Mariner's astrolabe
 Astronomy in the medieval Islamic world
 List of astronomical instruments
 Philippe Danfrie, designer and maker of mathematical instruments, globes and astrolabes
 Sextant

References
Footnotes

Notes

Bibliography
 .
 
 
 
 .
 
 
 .
 .

External links

Interactive digital astrolabe by Alex Boxer
A digital astrolabe (HTML5 and javascript)
Astrolabe Tech Made ... Not So Easy
paper astrolabe generator, from the ESO
"Hello World!" for the Astrolabe: The First Computer Video of Howard Covitz's Presentation at Ignite Phoenix, June 2009. Slides for Presentation Licensed as Creative Commons by-nc-nd.
Video of Tom Wujec demonstrating an astrolabe. Taken at TEDGlobal 2009. Includes clickable transcript. Licensed as Creative Commons by-nc-nd.
Archive of James E. Morrison's extensive website on Astrolabes
A working model of the Dr. Ludwig Oechslin's Astrolabium Galileo Galilei watch
Ulysse Nardin Astrolabium Galilei Galileo: A Detailed Explanation
Fully illustrated online catalogue of world's largest collection of astrolabes
Mobile astrolabe and horologium
 Medieval equal hour horary quadrant
 

Analog computers
Ancient Greek astronomy
Greek inventions
Ancient Greek technology
Astrometry
Astronomical instruments
Historical scientific instruments
Inclinometers
Astronomy in the medieval Islamic world
Technology in the medieval Islamic world
Mechanical calculators
Navigational equipment